Józef Młynarczyk (born 20 September 1953) is a Polish former professional footballer who played as a goalkeeper.

After representing three clubs in his homeland he played out the remainder of his career in France and Portugal, winning seven major titles with Porto during his one-and-a-half-season spell.

Młynarczyk played more 40 times with Poland, appearing in two World Cups with the country.

Club career
Born in Nowa Sól, Młynarczyk arrived at Widzew Łódź in 1980 aged 27, after playing for three modest clubs. During his four-year spell, in which he was equally first and second-choice, the team won two Ekstraklasa titles, finishing second in the other two. In the 1982–83 European Cup, he helped Widzew to the semifinals after edging Liverpool in the last-eight (4–3 on aggregate).

In 1984, aged 31, Młynarczyk signed with SC Bastia in France. In January 1986 he switched countries again, joining FC Porto from Portugal, where he won the European Cup, the Intercontinental Cup and the UEFA Super Cup. After an interesting battle for first-choice status with Zé Beto, he eventually became the starter – he was in goal for all of these finals – but lost his importance after the emergence of 18-year-old Vítor Baía, choosing to retire from football in June 1989.

Młynarczyk started immediately working with Porto's goalkeepers after his retirement, a position he would also hold at former side Widzew Łódź. On 21 April 2008, he resigned after the latter side hired Janusz Wójcik as manager.

International career
Młynarczyk won 42 caps for Poland during seven years, the first arriving in 1979 whilst in the ranks of lowly Odra Opole. He participated – always as starter – with the national team in two FIFA World Cups, 1982 and 1986, finishing in third place in the former edition and being ousted by Brazil in the round-of-16 in the latter.

Młynarczyk would also work as goalkeeping coach for the national team, before being replaced by Jacek Kazimierski.

International

Honours

Club
Widzew Łódź
Ekstraklasa: 1980–81, 1981–82

Porto
Primeira Liga: 1985–86, 1987–88
Taça de Portugal: 1987–88
Supertaça Cândido de Oliveira: 1986; Runner-up 1988
European Cup: 1986–87
Intercontinental Cup: 1987
UEFA Super Cup: 1987

Country
Poland
FIFA World Cup: Third-place 1982

References

External links

1953 births
Living people
People from Nowa Sól
Sportspeople from Lubusz Voivodeship
Polish footballers
Association football goalkeepers
Ekstraklasa players
Widzew Łódź players
Ligue 1 players
SC Bastia players
Primeira Liga players
FC Porto players
Poland international footballers
1982 FIFA World Cup players
1986 FIFA World Cup players
Polish expatriate footballers
Expatriate footballers in France
Expatriate footballers in Portugal
Polish expatriate sportspeople in France
Polish expatriate sportspeople in Portugal